Miss Arizona  is a 1919 western silent film directed by Otis B. Thayer and starring Gertrude Bondhill and James O'Neill. The film was shot in Englewood, Colorado by Thayer's Art-O-Graf film company. There is at least one known 35mm nitro copy of this film stored at Filmarchiv Austria.

Plot summary
Miss Arizona Farnley, tomboy of the West, avenges the death of her father, who was killed by Bob Evans during a bar fight at The Oasis.

Cast
 Gertrude Bondhill as Miss Arizona Farnley
 James O'Neill as Will Norman

Crew
 Otis B. Thayer Managing Director
 Vernon L. Walker Head Cameraman
 H. Haller Murphy Cameraman

References

External links

 

1919 films
1919 Western (genre) films
American black-and-white films
Films directed by Otis B. Thayer
Arrow Film Corporation films
Films shot in Colorado
Silent American Western (genre) films
1910s English-language films
1910s American films